The Government of Namibia fisheries portfolio was at Namibian independence in 1990 allocated to the Ministry of Agriculture. Only in 1991 was a separate Ministry of Fisheries and Marine Resources (MFMR) established, the first minister was Helmut Angula. The  fisheries minister is Derek Klazen, former mayor of Walvis Bay.

Ministers
All fisheries ministers in chronological order are:

See also
Economy of Namibia
Environment of Namibia

References

External links
Official website Ministry of Fisheries and Marine Resources

Fisheries
Fisheries
Economy of Namibia
Environment of Namibia
1991 establishments in Namibia